"Reach Out for the One Who Loves You" is a song by Australian singer songwriter Mark Holden. It was released as the lead single from Holden's third studio album, Encounter (1977). The song peaked at number 17 on the Kent Music Report.

Track listing
7"/ Cassette (EMI 11481)
Side A
 "Reach Out for the One Who Loves " - 2:50

Side B
 "Stay With Me" - 3:37

Charts

References

External links
 "Reach Out for the One Who Loves You" by Mark Holden

1977 songs
Mark Holden songs
1977 singles
Pop ballads